The Denver Cup was a mid-season college ice hockey tournament with the first iteration played in late December 1992. It was Discontinued after the 20th edition of the series.

History
Denver began hosting a mid-season tournament during the winter break for the 1992–93 season. The series was held at the team's home rink, the DU Arena, for the first two years before moving to the larger McNichols Arena, the future home of the Colorado Avalanche. By 1997, the Pioneers were able to get Wells Fargo to sign on as the sponsor to help fund the tournament.

After the McNichols Arena was closed in 1999 and the Avalanche moved to the Pepsi Center, the tournament returned to Denver's campus. In the interim, the Pioneers had built the Magness Arena which, though smaller than the McNichols Arena, had a much larger seating capacity than the DU Arena. By the end of the 2000s, interest in the tournament had waned and Wells Fargo ended its sponsorship after the 2009 series. Denver moved the tournament to the Thanksgiving weekend but, when no sponsor was secured after two years, the series was discontinued. In the final two years the tournament was styled as the 'Denver Cup Classic'.

During its 20-year run, Denver overwhelmingly dominated the series, winning 15 championships. The series had a Single-elimination format for all but one season; the 2009 series was a round-robin tournament with all matches set before the series began.

Results

Game results

1992

1993

1994

1995

1996

1997

1998

1999

† Denver won in a shootout.

2000

2001

2002

2003

2004

2005

† Boston College won in a shootout.

2006

† Massachusetts–Lowell won in a shootout.

2007

2008

† Denver won in a shootout.

2009

2010

2011

Participating teams

References

 
 
 
 
 
 
 
 

Ice hockey competitions in Denver
College sports in Colorado
College ice hockey tournaments in the United States
Recurring sporting events established in 1992
1992 establishments in Colorado
2011 disestablishments in Colorado